Samuel Howe may refer to:

 Samuel Gridley Howe (1801–1876), American physician, abolitionist and advocate of education for the blind
 Samuel Lyness Howe (1864–1939), businessman and politician in British Columbia, Canada
 Sam Howe (born 1938), American squash player

See also
Howe (surname)